Given a system transforming a set of inputs to output values, described by a mathematical function f, optimization refers to the generation and selection of a best solution from some set of available alternatives, by systematically choosing input values from within an allowed set, computing the value of the function, and recording the best value found during the process. Many real-world and theoretical problems may be modeled in this general framework. For example, the inputs can be design parameters of a motor, the output can be the power consumption, or the inputs can be business choices and the output can be the obtained profit, or the inputs can describe the configuration of a physical system and the output can be its energy.

An optimization problem can be represented in the following way
Given: a function f : A  R from some set A to the real numbers
Search for: an element x0 in A such that f(x0) ≤ f(x) for all x in A ("minimization").

Typically, A is some subset of the Euclidean space Rn, often specified by a set of constraints, equalities or inequalities that the members of A have to satisfy. Maximization can be reduced to minimization by multiplying the function by minus one.

The use of optimization software requires that the function f is defined in a suitable programming language and linked to the optimization software. The optimization software will deliver input values in A, the software module realizing f will deliver the computed value f(x). In this manner, a clear separation of concerns is obtained: different optimization software modules can be easily tested on the same function f, or a given optimization software can be used for different functions f.

The following tables provide a comparison of notable optimization software libraries, either specialized or general purpose libraries with significant optimization coverage.

See also 

 List of optimization software

References

External links
 OR/MS Today: 2013 Linear Programming Software Survey
 OR/MS Today: 1998 Nonlinear Programming Software Survey

 
Software comparisons